Jonah Feingold (born in New York City) is an American writer and director of several short films. He is known for his 2014 video Star Wars Wes Anderson, which parodied the trailer of Star Wars: The Force Awakens, the 2021 film Dating & New York, and the 2023 film At Midnight.

Biography 
In 2014, Feingold released the video Star Wars Wes Anderson which parodied the trailer of the upcoming Star Wars movie and quickly became popular online.

In 2015, he created the short film Letters to Manhattan (A Whole Foods Love Story).

In June 2017, he launched with Dante Basco the film project Bangarang which spins off the character Rufio, thug leader of the Lost Boys, from the 1991 movie Hook. The development of the project started with a Kickstarter campaign.

In 2020, Feingold wrote and directed his debut feature film, Dating & New York. It stars Jaboukie Young-White and Francesca Reale, and premiered at the Tribeca Film Festival on June 13, 2021. Prior to the festival, the film's rights were acquired by IFC Films.

On February 10, 2023, Feingold's second feature film, At Midnight, premiered on Paramount+.

References

External links 
 Official website
 IMDB page

American YouTubers
Writers from New York City
Living people
Year of birth missing (living people)